John Innes may refer to:

 John Innes (philanthropist) (1829–1904), English philanthropist
John Innes Centre, founded by funds bequeathed by Innes
John Innes compost, developed by the Centre
 John Innes (Toronto, Ontario politician) (died 1951), Toronto municipal politician
 John Innes (Gloucester, Ontario politician) (1877–1939)
 John de Innes (c. 1370–1414), bishop of Moray